The RPI Engineers men's ice hockey team is a National Collegiate Athletic Association (NCAA) Division I college ice hockey program that represents Rensselaer Polytechnic Institute (RPI). The Engineers are a member of ECAC Hockey (ECACH). They play at the Houston Field House in Troy, New York.

History 
Men's ice hockey at RPI dates back to 1901 and is one of the oldest programs in the United States. The team played as an independent NCAA Division I team from its inception in 1901 through 1938. The team resumed after World War II for the 1949–50 season, and in the following season Rensselaer joined Clarkson, Colgate, Middlebury, St. Lawrence, and Williams to form the Tri-State League for the 1950–51 season. The next three seasons, the 1952–1954 team won the Tri-State League season championships. RPI's first NCAA Tournament berth in 1953, coming in third, and the following season in 1954 the team won its first NCAA Men's Division I Ice Hockey Championship. After a six-year drought the program again made the NCAA Tournament in 1961, finishing fourth. The 1960–61 season would be the last season RPI competed in the Tri-State League, as RPI and fellow Tri-State League members Clarkson and St. Lawrence joined the new ECAC Hockey League.

Depending on how the rules are interpreted, the RPI men's ice hockey team may have the longest winning streak on record for a Division I team; in the 1984–85 season it went undefeated for 30 games, but one game was against the University of Toronto, a non-NCAA team. Continuing into the 1985–86 season, RPI continued undefeated over 38 games, including two wins over Toronto. Adam Oates and Daren Puppa, two players during that time, both went on to become stars in the NHL. Joe Juneau, who played from 1987 to 1991, also spent many years in the NHL. Graeme Townshend, who also played in the late 1980s, had a brief NHL career.  He is the first person of Jamaican ancestry to play in the National Hockey League.

Traditions 
The hockey team plays a significant role in the campus's culture, drawing thousands of fans each week to the Houston Field House during the season. The team's popularity even sparked the tradition of the hockey line, where students lined up for season tickets months in advance of the on-sale date. Today, the line generally begins a week or more before ticket sales. Another tradition since 1978 has been the "Big Red Freakout!" game held close to the first weekend of February. Fans usually dress in the schools colors Red and White, and gifts such as tee-shirts are distributed en masse.

From 1995 to 2009, RPI's Division III teams were known as the Red Hawks. However the hockey, football, cross-country, tennis, and track and field teams all chose to retain the longstanding Engineers name. The Red Hawks name was, at the time, very unpopular among the student body; a Red Hawk mascot was frequently taunted with thrown concessions and chants of "kill the chicken!" This was a major factor behind "Engineers" being restored for all teams in 2009.

The official hockey mascot, The Puckman–an anthropomorphic hockey puck with an engineer's helmet–has always been popular.

Season 
The RPI Engineers men's ice hockey typically plays between 35 and 42 regular season games per season in the ECAC Hockey Conference. They also usually play one exhibition game against a Canadian college hockey team from Ontario, Nova Scotia, or Quebec. During the season, RPI will play 22 conference games against the other 11 teams in the ECAC. RPI will play each team home game at the Houston Field House and each away game at the respective university's campus. The conference games are typically played on Friday and Saturday nights, with the ECAC scheduling reflecting the Ivy League scheduling of having traveling partners. RPI's travel partner has been Union College since they joined the league in the 1991-92 season. They also play 10-12 non-conference games against teams not in the ECAC. These games typically take place at the beginning of the season in October and around the Thanksgiving and New Year holidays. RPI also plays one non-conference game against their Capital District geographic rival, Union, at the Times Union Center, typically on the last Saturday of January in what has become known as the Mayor's Cup. RPI has opened ECAC Hockey conference play on the last weekend of October against Union since the 2012–13 season. The first conference home game is known as Black Friday or Black Saturday which alternates each year. Other highlights of the season include the Big Red Freakout, which is played on the last or second to last Saturday home game in February.

At the conclusion of the regular season the team will play a minimum of two postseason games in the ECAC Hockey Men's Ice Hockey Tournament in the beginning of March. If RPI wins the ECAC Tournament or is invited to the NCAA Tournament as an at-large team, they would then play at least one postseason game in late March in the single elimination tournament. RPI last played in the NCAA Tournament in 2011.

Season-by-season results

Source:

Records vs. current ECAC Hockey teams
As of the completion of 2018–19 season

Head coaches

As of the completion of 2021–22 season

Current roster
As of December 24, 2022.

Statistical Leaders
Source:

Career points leaders

Career goaltending leaders

GP = Games played; Min = Minutes played; W = Wins; L = Losses; T = Ties; GA = Goals against; SO = Shutouts; SV% = Save percentage; GAA = Goals against average

Minimum 30 games

Statistics current through the start of the 2021–22 season.

Awards and honors

Hockey Hall of Fame
Source:

Adam Oates (2012)

United States Hockey Hall of Fame
Source:

Ned Harkness (1994)

NCAA

Individual awards

NCAA Scoring Champion
 Frank Chiarelli: 1952
 Jerry Knightley: 1964

NCAA Tournament Most Outstanding Player
 Abbie Moore: 1954

All-Americans
AHCA First Team All-Americans

1952-53: Herb LaFontaine, D; Frank Chiarelli, F
1955-56: Garry Kearns, F
1957-58: Paul Midghall, F
1958-59: Paul Midghall, F
1962-63: Bob Brinkworth, F
1963-64: Bob Brinkworth, F; Jerry Knightley, F
1964-65: Jerry Knightley, F
1983-84: John Carter, F; Adam Oates, F
1984-85: Ken Hammond, D; Adam Oates, F
1985-86: Mike Dark, D
1989-90: Joé Juneau, F
1999-00: Joel Laing, G
2001-02: Marc Cavosie, F
2009-10: Chase Polacek, F
2010-11: Chase Polacek, F
2012-13: Nick Bailen, D

AHCA Second Team All-Americans

1951-52: Frank Chiarelli, F
1953-54: Frank Chiarelli, F; Abbie Moore, F
1983-84: Daren Puppa, G
1984-85: John Carter, F
1990-91: Joé Juneau, F
1992-93: Neil Little, G
1996-97: Eric Healey, F
1997-98: Eric Healey, F
1999-00: Brian Pothier, D; Brad Tapper, F
2001-02: Matt Murley, F
2010-11: Nick Bailen, D
2013-14: Ryan Haggerty, F

ECAC Hockey

Individual awards

Player of the Year
 Bob Brinkworth: 1963, 1964
 Marc Cavosie: 2002
 Chase Polacek: 2010, 2011

Rookie of the Year
 Bob Brinkworth: 1962
 Don Cutts: 1972
 George Servinis: 1983
 Jerry D'Amigo: 2010
 Jason Kasdorf: 2013

Ken Dryden Award
 Joel Laing: 2000

Most Outstanding Player in Tournament
 Adam Oates: 1984
 Daren Puppa: 1985
 Mike Tamburro: 1995

All-Conference
First Team All-ECAC Hockey

 1961-62: Bob Brinkworth, F
 1962-63: Bob Brinkworth, F
 1963-64: Bill Sack, D; Fred Kitchen, F; Bob Brinkworth, F; Jerry Knightley, F
 1964-65: Jerry Knightley, F
 1984-85: Ken Hammond, D; John Carter, F; Adam Oates, F
 1985–86: Mike Dark, D
 1989–90: Joé Juneau, F
 1992–93: Neil Little, G
 1997–98: Eric Healey, F
 1998–99: Dan Riva, F
 1999–00: Joel Laing, G; Brad Tapper, F
 2001–02: Marc Cavosie, F; Matt Murley, F
 2009–10: Chase Polacek, F
 2010–11: Nick Bailen, D; Chase Polacek, F
 2012–13: Nick Bailen, D
 2013–14: Ryan Haggerty, F

Second Team All-ECAC Hockey

 1961-62: Brian Robins, D; Tom McMahon, D; Jim Josephson, F
 1962-63: Brian Pryce, D; Jerry Knightley, F
 1963-64: Bill Grisdale, D
 1967-68: Dale Watson, F
 1971-72: Don Cutts, G
 1972-73: Don Cutts, G
 1977-78: Ian Harrison, G
 1983-84: John Carter, F; Adam Oates, F; Marty Dallman, F
 1990–91: Joé Juneau, F
 1991–92: Stephane Robitaille, D
 1992–93: Brad Layzell, D
 1993–94: Ron Pasco, F
 1994–95: Adam Bartell, D
 1995–96: Patrick Rochon, D
 1996–97: Eric Healey, F
 1999–00: Brian Pothier, D
 2003–04: Nathan Marsters, G; Scott Basiuk, D; Kevin Croxton, F
 2009–10: Allen York, G
 2012–13: Jason Kasdorf, G
 2015–16: Jason Kasdorf, G
 2021–22: Ture Linden, F

Third Team All-ECAC Hockey

 2005–06: Keith McWilliams, D; Kevin Croxton, F
 2006–07: Jake Luthi, D
 2010–11: Allen York, G

ECAC Hockey All-Rookie Team

 1987–88: Bruce Coles, F; Joé Juneau, F
 1989–90: Allen Kummu, D; Francois Cadoret, F
 1990–91: Neil Little, G
 1991–92: Wayne Clarke, F; Craig Hamelin, F
 1992–93: Tim Regan, F; Bryan Richardson, F
 1994–95: Eric Healey, F
 1995–96: Matt Garver, F; Alain St. Hilaire, F
 1996–97: Pete Gardiner, F
 1998–99: Matt Murley, F
 1999–00: Marc Cavosie, F
 2000–01: Nathan Marsters, G
 2002–03: Kevin Croxton, F
 2003–04: Oren Eizenman, F
 2005–06: Mathias Lange, G
 2007–08: Chase Polacek, F
 2008–09: Patrick Cullen, F
 2009–10: Jerry D'Amigo, F; Brandon Pirri, F
 2012–13: Jason Kasdorf, G
 2014–15: Drew Melanson, F
 2015–16: Cam Hackett, G
 2022–23: Sutter Muzzatti, F

Olympians
This is a list of Rensselaer alumni were a part of an Olympic team.

Engineers in the NHL
As of July 1, 2022.

Source:

References

External links
RPI Engineers men's ice hockey

 
Ice hockey teams in New York (state)